Bruntál District is a district (okres) within Moravian-Silesian Region of the Czech Republic. Its capital is Bruntál, but the largest town is Krnov. Part of the district belongs to Moravia, while another part belongs to Czech Silesia.

List of municipalities
Andělská Hora – 
Bílčice – 
Bohušov – 
Brantice – 
Bruntál – 
Břidličná – 
Býkov-Láryšov – 
Čaková – 
Dětřichov nad Bystřicí – 
Dívčí Hrad – 
Dlouhá Stráň – 
Dolní Moravice – 
Dvorce – 
Heřmanovice – 
Hlinka – 
Holčovice – 
Horní Benešov – 
Horní Město – 
Horní Životice – 
Hošťálkovy – 
Janov – 
Jindřichov – 
Jiříkov – 
Karlova Studánka – 
Karlovice – 
Krasov – 
Krnov – 
Křišťanovice – 
Leskovec nad Moravicí – 
Lichnov – 
Liptaň – 
Lomnice – 
Ludvíkov – 
Malá Morávka – 
Malá Štáhle – 
Město Albrechtice – 
Mezina – 
Milotice nad Opavou – 
Moravskoslezský Kočov – 
Nová Pláň – 
Nové Heřminovy – 
Oborná – 
Osoblaha – 
Petrovice – 
Razová – 
Roudno – 
Rudná pod Pradědem – 
Rusín – 
Rýmařov – 
Ryžoviště – 
Slezské Pavlovice – 
Slezské Rudoltice – 
Stará Ves – 
Staré Heřminovy – 
Staré Město – 
Světlá Hora – 
Svobodné Heřmanice – 
Široká Niva – 
Třemešná – 
Tvrdkov – 
Úvalno – 
Václavov u Bruntálu – 
Valšov – 
Velká Štáhle – 
Vrbno pod Pradědem – 
Vysoká – 
Zátor

See also 
Silesia Euroregion

References

 
Districts of the Czech Republic